New Jerusalem, California may refer to:
New Jerusalem, former name of El Rio, California
New Jerusalem, former name of Petrolia, California

See also
 New Jerusalem Airport